Keiko Ishida (born 3 April 1973) is a Japanese former professional tennis player.

Ishida reached a best singles ranking of 349 on the professional tour and featured in the main draw of the WTA Tour tournament at Nagoya in 1995. As a doubles player she had a best ranking of 138 in the world and won 13 ITF events.

ITF finals

Singles: 3 (0–3)

Doubles: 22 (13–9)

References

External links
 
 

1973 births
Living people
Japanese female tennis players
20th-century Japanese women
21st-century Japanese women